My Dear Cat is a 2014 South Korean daily drama starring Choi Yoon-young, Hyun Woo, Choi Min, and Jun Hyo-seong. It aired on KBS1 from June 9 to November 21, 2014 on Mondays to Fridays at 20:25 for 119 episodes.

Plot
While looking for her lost cat, magazine journalist Go Yang-soon meets law school student and part-time photographer Yeom Chi-woong. Soon, they begin to get to know each other and each other's families.

Cast

Main characters
Choi Yoon-young as Go Yang-soon
Hyun Woo as Yeom Chi-woong
Choi Min as Yoon Sung-il
Jun Hyo-seong as Han Soo-ri

Supporting characters
Yang-soon's family
Dokgo Young-jae as Go Dong-joon
Lee Kyung-jin as Han Young-sook
Park So-hyun as Han Eun-sook

Chi-woong's Family
Lee Jae-yong as Yeom Byung-soo
Seo Yi-sook as Hong Soo-ja
Choi Sung-min as Yeom Chi-joo

Sung-il's family
Hwang Beom-shik as Yoon Noh-in
Kim Seo-ra as Yoon Hye-jung
Go Won-hee as Shin Ji-eun

Volcano Building
Kim Young-jae as Shin Se-ki
Yoon In-jo as Choi Do-hee
Go Do-young as Joon-ah
Ban Sang-yoon as Hwang Tae-soo

Ratings

 ratings denote the highest numbers the series has garnered.
 ratings denote the lowest numbers the series has garnered.
(-) denotes that episode has not yet been aired in that channel.

Awards and nominations

See also
List of South Korean dramas

References

External links
  
 
 

Korean Broadcasting System television dramas
2014 South Korean television series debuts
Korean-language television shows
2014 South Korean television series endings
South Korean romantic comedy television series